Francisco "Kiko" Porto (born August 28, 2003) is a Brazilian racing driver who competes full-time in the Indy Pro 2000 Championship, driving for DEForce Racing. He is the champion of the 2021 U.S. F2000 National Championship.

Racing record

Career summary

* Season still in progress.

American open–wheel racing results

U.S. F2000 National Championship

Indy Pro 2000 Championship

References

External links
 
 

2003 births
Living people
Sportspeople from Recife
Brazilian racing drivers
U.S. F2000 National Championship drivers
Stock Car Brasil drivers

Indy Pro 2000 Championship drivers
United States F4 Championship drivers
NACAM F4 Championship drivers